The Somerset Maugham Award is a British literary prize given each year by the Society of Authors. Set up by William Somerset Maugham in 1947 the awards enable young writers to enrich their work by gaining experience in foreign countries. The awards go to writers under the age of 30 with works published in the year before the award; the work can be either non-fiction, fiction or poetry.

Since 1964 multiple winners have usually been chosen in the same year. In 1975 and in 2012 the award was not given.

List of winners

1940s

1950s

1960s

1970s

1980s

1990s

2000s

2010s

2020s

References

1947 establishments in the United Kingdom
Awards established in 1947
Literary awards honouring young writers
Society of Authors awards